South Fork Crystal River is a tributary of the Crystal River in Gunnison County, Colorado, United States. The stream's source is the confluence of Rock Creek and the East Fork in the White River National Forest. It flows through Crystal Canyon to a confluence with the North Fork Crystal River that forms the Crystal River.

See also
List of rivers of Colorado

References

Rivers of Colorado
Rivers of Gunnison County, Colorado
Tributaries of the Colorado River in Colorado